The 2004–05 Gonzaga Bulldogs men's basketball team represented Gonzaga University in the 2004–05 NCAA Division I men's basketball season.

Preseason

Departures

Incoming Transfers

2004 Recruiting Class

Roster

Schedule

|-
!colspan=9| Regular season

|-
!colspan=9 style=| WCC Tournament

|-
!colspan=9 style=| NCAA tournament

References

Gonzaga Bulldogs
Gonzaga Bulldogs men's basketball seasons
Gonzaga Bulldogs men's basketball
Gonzaga Bulldogs men's basketball
Gonzaga